"Man Alive" is a song by Australian rock musician Diesel. It was included on his debut album, Hepfidelity (1992). It peaked at number 20 in Australia and 25 in New Zealand. In October 1993, it was released in the United Kingdom through Parlophone but did not chart.

Track listings
Australian CD single
 "Man Alive" – 4:10
 "Tell The Truth" – 4:09

European CD single
 "Man Alive" (Remix – single version) – 4:10
 "Tip of My Tongue" (album version) – 4:12

UK CD single
 "Man Alive"
 "Get Lucky" (live)
 "Rhythm Of Your Soul" (live)	
 "One More Time" (acoustic)

Charts

Release history

References

External links
 
 Lyrics of this song - Man Alive

1991 songs
1992 singles
Chrysalis Records singles
Diesel (musician) songs
EMI Records singles
Parlophone singles
Songs written by Diesel (musician)